The following is a list of episodes for the American animated television series Ben 10. The series was created by "Man of Action", a group composed of writers Duncan Rouleau, Joe Casey, Joe Kelly, and Steven T. Seagle. The series was followed by Ben 10: Alien Force.

Ben 10s first episode, "And Then There Were 10", originally aired on Cartoon Network on December 27, 2005 as a sneak peek during Cartoon Network's "Sneak Peek Week" block, airing alongside fellow Cartoon Network original series My Gym Partner's a Monkey, Cartoon Network European co-production Robotboy, and acquired Canadian YTV series Zixx. The series made its official debut on January 13, 2006.

Series overview

Episodes

Season 1 (2005–06)
10 Aliens: Heatblast, Wildmutt, Diamondhead, XLR8, Grey Matter, Four Arms, Stinkfly, Ripjaws, Upgrade, Ghostfreak.Season 2 (2006) 
12 Aliens: Heatblast, Wildmutt, Diamondhead, XLR8, Grey Matter, Four Arms, Stinkfly, Ripjaws, Upgrade, Ghostfreak, Cannonbolt, Wildvine.Season 3 (2006–07)
19 Aliens: Heatblast, Wildmutt, Diamondhead, XLR8, Grey Matter, Four Arms, Stinkfly, Ripjaws, Upgrade, Ghostfreak, Cannonbolt, Wildvine, Spitter, Buzzshock, Arctiguana, Benwolf, Benmummy, Benvictor, Upchuck.Season 4 (2007–08)
22 Aliens: Heatblast, Wildmutt, Diamondhead, XLR8, Grey Matter, Four Arms, Stinkfly, Ripjaws, Upgrade, Ghostfreak, Cannonbolt, Wildvine,  Spitter, Buzzshock, Arctiguana, Benwolf, Benmummy, Benvictor, Upchuck, Ditto, Eyeguy, Waybig.'

Shorts

Movies
23 Aliens: Heatblast, Wildmutt, Diamondhead, XLR8, Grey Matter, Four Arms, Stinkfly, Ripjaws, Upgrade, Ghostfreak, Cannonbolt, Wildvine, Blitzwolfer, Snare-Oh, Frankenstrike, Upchuck, Ditto, Eye Guy and Way Big.

Home media

See also 
 List of Ben 10: Alien Force episodes
 List of Ben 10: Ultimate Alien episodes
 List of Ben 10: Omniverse episodes
 List of Ben 10 (2016 TV series) episodes

Notes

References 

Ben 10
Lists of Cartoon Network television series episodes
2000s television-related lists
Lists of American science fiction television series episodes
2005